Jaggu Ani Juliet is a 2023 Indian Marathi-language romantic comedy film directed by Mahesh Limaye. It is produced by Punit Balan Studios. The film stars Amey Wagh, Vaidehi Parashurami in lead and Manoj Joshi, Pravin Tarde, Avinash Narkar, Sameer Dharmadhikari, Keyuri Shah, Angad Mhaskar, Sunil Abhyankar, Sameer chowghule , Savita Malpekar,  Upendra limaye, Abhidnya bhave, Hrishikesh Joshi, Jaywant Wadkar, Renuka Daftardar in pivotal roles.  	

The film was theatrically released on 10 February 2023.

Cast 

 Amey Wagh as Jaggu
 Vaidehi Parshurami as Juliet
 Manoj Joshi
 Pravin Tarde
 Avinash Narkar  
 Sameer Dharmadhikari
 Savita Malpekar   
 Upendra Limaye   
 Jaywant Wadkar   
 Sunil Abhyankar
 Hrishikesh Joshi     
 Sameer Chowgule     
 Abhidnya Bhave       
 Renuka Daftardar       
 Angad Mhaskar       
 Keyuri Shah

Soundtrack 
The film's  songs are composed by Ajay-Atul while lyrics written by Ajay - Atul and Guru Thakur.

Reception

Box Office 
The movie collected 1.00 crores in three days. The first day movie collected 0.27 crore, 0.33 crore on the second and 0.40 crore on the third day.

References

External links 

 

2023 films
Indian romance films